Garry Adam (born May 29, 1947) is a Canadian football defensive tackle who played for the Edmonton Eskimos of the Canadian Football League. He was signed by the Eskimos in 1973, who used a territorial exemption to select him. Adam played in four regular season games in his rookie year.

References 

1947 births
Canadian football defensive backs
Alberta Golden Bears football players
Edmonton Elks players
Living people